is a city located in Fukuoka Prefecture, Japan. The city was founded on April 1, 1954. As of May 31, 2011, the city had an estimated population of 48,808, with 17,322 households and a population density of 1,166.26 persons per km². The total area is 41.85 km².

Places of worship 

 Mizuta Tenmangū

Transportation
It has three stations on the Kagoshima Main Line and one station on the Kyūshū Shinkansen.

See also
Chikugo Province
Kyushu Ohtani Junior College

References

External links
 Chikugo City official website 

 
Cities in Fukuoka Prefecture